Cine Holliúdy is 2012 Brazilian comedy film, directed by Halder Gomes and starring Edmilson Filho, Miriam Freeland and Roberto Bomtempo, based on the award-winning short film Cine Holiúdy – O Astista Contra o Caba do Mal.

The film premiered at the Cine Ceará Festival on June 8, 2012. It was released on August 9, 2013 in Fortaleza and some cities of the metropolitan region for general public.

Plot
The arrival of television  in the country side of Ceará, in the 70s, put into question the small movie theaters businesses. But a hero named Francisgleydisson, decided to fight to keep alive his passion for cinema.

Cast
 Edmilson Filho as Francisgleydisson
 Miriam Freeland as Maria Das Graças
 Joel Gomes as Francisgleydisson's son
 Roberto Bomtempo as Olegário Elpídio
 Angeles Woo as TV host
 Fiorella Mattheis as "the Dream's Girl"
 Rainer Cadete as Shaolin
 Karla Karenina as soccer's supporter
 Marcio Greyck as buyer of cars
 Jorge Ritchie as priest Mesquita
 Fernanda Callou as Whelbaneyde
 Falcão as Isaías
 Haroldo Guimarães as Ling, Orilaudo Lécio e Munízio
 João Neto as "the Drunky"

References

External links
  
 

2012 comedy films
2012 films
Brazilian comedy films
Films directed by Halder Gomes
Films shot in Fortaleza
2010s Portuguese-language films